Martha Kunig-Rinach, née Martha Rinach (1 April 1898 – 24 March 1993) was a German actress and operetta singer (mezzo-soprano).

Life and career 
Born in Munich, Kunich-Rinach made her debut at the age of 17 at the Munich Residenz Theatre. From 1938 to 1944 she was engaged at the Münchner Volkstheater. Two years later she came to the Staatstheater am Gärtnerplatz, to which she belonged for many years as a permanent member of the ensemble. Kunig-Rinach, who in the end only achieved regional fame, also played small character roles in several German movies such as: Das seltsame Leben des Herrn Bruggs (1936), Der weißblaue Löwe (1952), Ein Herz schlägt für dich (1949),  (1951), Begegnung mit Werther (1949), Das kann jedem passieren (1952), and Das schreckliche Mädchen (1990). She also appeared on radio, including 15 episodes (from 1969 to 1985) of the Bayerischer Rundfunk program Das Bairisch Herz, Heiteres und Besinnliches in Worten und Liedern. In 1962 she played a leading role in "Das Dienstjubiläum" in Der Komödienstadel alongside Michl Lang,  and others. From the 1950s, she also worked as a dubbing artist.

Kunich-Rinach retired from the stage in 1982. She died in the city of her birth at the age of 94 and is buried in the Ostfriedhof cemetery. She was married to the tenor and actor Rudolf Kunig (1894–1951).

References

External links 
 
 Martha Kunig-Rinach on Film portal

1898 births
1993 deaths
Actresses from Munich
German stage actresses
German film actresses
German voice actresses
German operatic mezzo-sopranos